Respendial or Respindal was king of a group of Alans in western Europe in the early 5th century CE. After the Crossing of the Rhine in 405 or 406, Respendial's Alans invaded the Roman Empire. The other group of Alans was led by Goar, who joined the Romans.

Biography

Vandal–Frankish war 
Respendial is mentioned in the Frigeridus fragment, embedded in Gregory of Tours's work, describing the Vandal–Frankish war that preceded the Crossing of the Rhine (the crossing was dated to 31 December 406 by Prosper of Aquitaine). According to Frigeridus, the Roman-allied Franks were inflicting heavy casualties on the Vandals over the course of probably several battles, killing 20,000 Vandal warriors and their king Godigisel, and were on the verge of exterminating the tribe. At that point – according to MacDowall (2016) probably in the summer or autumn of 406 – another Alan king, Respendial, came to the Vandals' rescue and defeated the Franks, "although Goar had gone over to the Romans."

Into Gaul and Spain 
Thereafter, the Vandals and Respendial's Alans crossed the Rhine. It's unclear from Frigeridus' account what happened to Goar's Alans, but other sources make clear that they were eventually settled in Gaul near Orléans by the Romans, while the Vandals, Suebi, and Respendial's Alans continued into Spain. According to bishop Hydatius' chronicle, the Vandals (Silings and Asdings) were the first to arrive in Spain in September or October 409, while Gregory notes that Suebi and Alans (presumably those led by Respendial) followed them later.

Respendial's fate is unknown; by 418, he was no longer king. He had been succeeded by Attaces, who was killed when the Visigoths invaded Hispania. This group of Alans thereafter united with the Asding Vandals, with whom they crossed into Africa and established an independent kingdom.

Note

References

Alanic rulers
5th-century Iranian people